Peter Forsyth Christensen (born December 24, 1952) is an American prelate of the Roman Catholic Church who has been serving as bishop of the Diocese of Boise in Idaho since 2014.  He previously served as bishop of the Diocese of Superior in Wisconsin from 2007 to 2014. 

Christensen was ordained into the priesthood on May 25, 1985, by Archbishop John Roach. On November 4, 2014, Pope Francis named Christensen as the eighth bishop in the Diocese of Boise. He was installed as bishop by Archbishop Harry Flynn in Boise on December 17, 2014, at St. John's Cathedral.

Biography

Early life and education
Peter Christensen was born on December 24, 1952, in Altadena, California.  He was the fourth of eight children; his parents were Robert and Ann (née Forsyth) Christensen. The family later moved to Palos Verdes, California.  Christensen attended Palos Verdes High School, with interests in becoming a potter.  He briefly attended the College of the Redwoods in Eureka, California, but dropped out in 1975 to move with his mother and siblings to Minneapolis-Saint Paul, Minnesota.  Christensen enrolled at the University of St. Thomas in that area, obtaining a Bachelor of Art History degree. After graduation, Christensen worked as a graphic designer.

After deciding to become a priest, Christensen in 1981 entered Saint Paul Seminary in St. Paul, Minnesota. During his seminary education, he studied in Israel for a semester.  He graduated with a Master of Divinity degree from Saint Paul Seminary.

Ordination and ministry
Christensen was ordained to the priesthood for the Archdiocese of Minneapolis-St. Paul by Archbishop John Roach on May 25, 1985.  After his ordination, Christensen was appointed as assistant pastor of St. Olaf Parish in Minneapolis.  He left St. Olaf in 1989 to become spiritual director of St. John Vianney College Seminary in St. Paul. 

After receiving a Master of Applied Spirituality degree, Christensen became rector of St. John Vianney.  During his tenure, St. John Vianney became the largest Catholic college seminary in the United States.In June 1999, Christensen was appointed pastor of Nativity of Our Lord Parish in St. Paul, where he continued traditional practices, such as perpetual Eucharistic adoration. He also reconstructed the church and rectory.

Bishop of Superior

On June 28, 2007, Pope Benedict XVI named Christensen as bishop of the Diocese of Superior. After receiving a telephone call from Archbishop Pietro Sambi bringing news of his appointment, he "sobbed for about 15 minutes" as he had not sought the episcopal office." During a press conference, Christensen promised to be a "good listener" in his new role as bishop. He was consecrated at the Cathedral of Saint Paul in St. Paul on September 14, 2007.

Christensen joined with other Wisconsin bishops in issuing a warning against the use of POLST, Physician (or Provider) Orders for Life-Sustaining Treatment, in a statement published Wednesday, July 25, 2012. In “Upholding the Dignity of Human Life,” the bishops wrote that the use of POLST has grave implications for the dignity of human life and they “encourage all Catholics to avoid using all such documents, programs and materials.”  In January 2014, Christensen announced that Common Core curriculum would not be allowed in the Catholic schools of his diocese.

Bishop of Boise, Idaho
On November 4, 2014, Pope Francis named Christensen as the eighth bishop of the Diocese of Boise. He was installed on December 17, 2014, in the Cathedral of St. John the Evangelist in Boise, Idaho.

On February 2, 2017, police arrested Thomas Faucher, a retired diocese priest, for possessing and distributing child pornography. Surprised by the announcement, Christensen immediately suspended Faucher from priestly ministry. He pleaded guilty and was sentenced to 25 years in prison.  The Congregation for the Doctrine of the Faith at the Vatican defrocked Faucher in December 2019.  Christensen made this statement:  “There are no excuses for such behavior by any one of our clergy."

In April 2020, Christensen issued a memo containing orders for diocese priests, including an order banning them from celebrating mass ad orientem (facing the altar).

See also

 Catholic Church hierarchy
 Catholic Church in the United States
 Historical list of the Catholic bishops of the United States
 List of Catholic bishops of the United States
 Lists of patriarchs, archbishops, and bishops

References

External links

Diocese of Boise
Diocese of Superior
Whispers in the Loggia: "Appointments: Not Just for Tuesdays"
Catholic News Agency: "Pope Benedict names new bishop for Diocese of Superior"

 

1952 births
Living people
People from Pasadena, California
21st-century Roman Catholic bishops in the United States
Religious leaders from Wisconsin
Roman Catholic bishops of Superior
Roman Catholic Archdiocese of Saint Paul and Minneapolis
Roman Catholic bishops of Boise
People from Palos Verdes, California
Catholics from California